Arfang Boubacar Daffé (born 24 June 1991) is a Senegalese professional footballer who plays as a midfielder.

Club career
Daffé is a product of Diambars FC. The club loaned him to Atlético Madrid B during 2011, but after suffering an injury he returned to Diambars.

Paykan
In August 2017, he signed a one-year contract with Paykan.

References

External links
 Western African Football article
 

1991 births
Living people
Senegalese footballers
Association football wingers
Atlético Madrid B players
Diambars FC players
FC Kolkheti-1913 Poti players
Paykan F.C. players
FC Torpedo Kutaisi players
Nassaji Mazandaran players
FC Dinamo Tbilisi players
Segunda División B players
Senegal Premier League players
Erovnuli Liga players
Persian Gulf Pro League players
Senegalese expatriate footballers
Expatriate footballers in Spain
Senegalese expatriate sportspeople in Spain
Expatriate footballers in Georgia (country)
Senegalese expatriate sportspeople in Georgia (country)
Expatriate footballers in Iran
Senegalese expatriate sportspeople in Iran
FC Samtredia players